A list of American films released in 1980.

Ordinary People won the Academy Award for Best Picture. The highest-grossing film of 1980 was The Empire Strikes Back.



Highest-grossing

A

B–C

D–G

H–L

M–P

R–S

T–Z

See also
 1980 in American television
 1980 in the United States

Notes

References

External links

 
 List of 1980 box office number-one films in the United States

1980
Films
Lists of 1980 films by country or language